Maniakoi is a town in the municipal unit of Agia Triada, Kastoria regional unit, Western Macedonia, Greece. Since the 2010 local government reform, it is part of the municipality Kastoria. It was the seat of the former municipality Agia Triada between 1997 and 2010. In 2011 its population was 3,055.

See also
List of settlements in the Kastoria regional unit

References

Populated places in Kastoria (regional unit)